Carl Schaefer may refer to:
 Carl Schaefer (artist) (1903–1995), Canadian artist
 Carl Schaefer (footballer) (1894–?), Australian footballer for St Kilda
 Carl Schaefer (politician), German politician

See also
 Karl Schaefer, American television producer and writer